The 1950–51 Ohio Bobcats men's basketball team represented Ohio University in the college basketball season of 1950–51. The team was coached by Jim Snyder in his 2nd season as Ohio's head coach.  They played their home games at the Men's Gymnasium. They finished the season 13–11.  They finished second in the Mid-American Conference with a conference record of 4–4.

Schedule

|-
!colspan=9 style=| Regular Season

 Source:

Statistics

Player statistics
Final 1950–51 Statistics

Source

References

Ohio Bobcats men's basketball seasons
Ohio
1950 in sports in Ohio
1951 in sports in Ohio